The Westerville High School - Vine Street School is a historic school in Westerville, Ohio. It was built in 1896 by the Columbus architecture firm of Yost and Packard. The high school is an example of Romanesque Revival architecture.

The building was opened to the public on during a grand ceremony on March 19, 1896. Today, the school is referred to as the Emerson Magnet school, which specializes in teaching children foreign languages and cultures.

References

External links
 Official website

Westerville, Ohio
National Register of Historic Places in Franklin County, Ohio
Yost and Packard buildings